Roadrunner Records is an American record label focused on heavy metal and hard rock bands. Founded in the Netherlands in 1980, it is now a division of Warner Music Group and is based in New York City.

History
The label was launched in 1980 in the Netherlands. Roadrunner's initial business was importing North American metal-band recordings into Europe. In 1986, Roadrunner opened its US headquarters in New York City and later opened offices in the United Kingdom, Germany, France, Japan, Australia, Denmark, Russia and Canada. Early successes included albums from King Diamond (the first Roadrunner artist to enter the Billboard Top 200 albums chart) and Annihilator. The label also handled early Metallica releases in the Scandinavian region. The end of the 1980s saw the release of two albums that are now considered classics of their respective genres: Obituary's Slowly We Rot and Sepultura's Beneath the Remains.

The 1990s saw the arrival of acts such as Life of Agony, Machine Head, Suffocation, Type O Negative, and underground grunge rockers Willard. As the 1990s wore on, several of Roadrunner's bands managed to make an impact on the mainstream, most notably Sepultura and Type O Negative. Sepultura's 1993 album, Chaos A.D., became the first Roadrunner band to crack the Top 40 on the Billboard album chart. Type O Negative became the first Roadrunner band to receive a certification from the RIAA; this was a Gold award (and later Platinum award) for the 1993 album Bloody Kisses, which was certified in 1995. The band also became the first Roadrunner band to receive radio play. In 2000, Slipknot became the first Roadrunner band to go Platinum. Nickelback were also very successful on the label, although they were signed to another label in their native Canada.  Derek Shulman ran the label in the late '90s.

Roadrunner Records ran into financial trouble in 2001 after its distribution deal with RED Distribution through Edel Music was aborted after Edel ended up in US$400 million in debt. Unfortunately, as Roadrunner had just taken out a US$15 million loan from Edel, Cees Wessels was forced to put 49% of the label's stock up for $30 million, attracting the interest of major labels such as RCA Records, Atlantic Records and Columbia Records. In July 2001, The Island Def Jam Music Group purchased a 50% stake in Roadrunner worth US$33 million, larger than the asking price. While there were fears of legal action from Edel, who owned 17% of Roadrunner's stock, negotiations allowed the label to switch "immediately" to Island Def Jam and its distributor, Universal Music & Video Distribution.

On December 18, 2006, Warner Music Group signed an agreement to purchase a majority in shares (73.5%) of Roadrunner Records' parent company, Roadrunner Music Group B.V.  This deal became finalized on January 29, 2007, after receiving regulatory approval in Germany.

On June 11, 2008, Roadrunner Records was voted as the "Best Metal Label" by Metal Hammer at their Golden Gods Awards, an award that it has won the past four years in a row. The award was accepted by Sharon den Adel and Ruud Jolie of Within Temptation, one of Roadrunner's biggest acts.

Roadrunner Records was significantly affected by Warner Music Group's legal dispute against YouTube, including having their account's YouTube partnership canceled. Most of the videos on their channel, however, are still viewable. There is even a disclaimer talking about Warner's dispute right on the channel.

On November 11, 2010, Warner Music Group announced they had acquired the remaining of Roadrunner's stock, acquiring the company fully. However, WMG maintained that  Roadrunner would still continue to operate as a distinct brand. Cees Wessels, the label's founder, remained as CEO. Employees at Roadrunner nicknamed WMG's acquisition of the company "The Red Wedding", in reference to the Game of Thrones episode "The Rains of Castamere".

On April 26, 2012, it was announced that Warner Music Group would make substantial cutbacks throughout Roadrunner Records worldwide operations. According to staff working at the company, The UK offices and the Canadian offices of Roadrunner Records are to be closed completely, with severe levels of cutbacks occurring across the rest of the label worldwide. It has also been announced that the Roadrunner office in The Netherlands is to close, and that the label's founder Cees Wessels is stepping down from his role of CEO. The following years saw several major Roadrunner acts leave the label, including DevilDriver and Alter Bridge (who both moved to Napalm Records, with Devildriver's catalogue being sold to The Echo Label), Opeth, Machine Head, and Soulfly (all of whom followed former A&R of SVP Monte Conner to Nuclear Blast) and Dream Theater (who signed with InsideOut Music in 2017) In July 2017, British rock band Milk Teeth signed with Roadrunner Records.

In June 2018, Roadrunner became a sub-label of Warner's Elektra Music Group division. In June 2022, Elektra Music Group, and subsequently Roadrunner, was merged into the new umbrella label group 300 Elektra Entertainment.

International labels

Roadrunner Records UK
Roadrunner Records UK operates out of the Warner Music London office. Their roster includes the addition of Alter Bridge, Down, Satyricon and Slash.

Notable artists

Currently signed 

Angel Du$t
Coheed and Cambria
Corey Taylor
Dinosaur Pile-Up (Parlophone/Roadrunner)
Gojira
Higher Power
Highly Suspect
Motionless in White
Stone Sour
Theory of a Deadman
Trivium
Turnstile

Past Roadrunner Records artists

3 Inches of Blood
8 Foot Sativa (NZ)
36 Crazyfists (excluding US)
A Skylit Drive (excluding Fearless)
The Agony Scene
Airbourne
Alesana (including Fearless)
Alexisonfire
Alter Bridge
Amanda Palmer
Amen
The Amity Affliction
Annihilator
Anyone
Artillery
Atreyu (excluding US)
Atrocity
Avenged Sevenfold (EU)
Atrophy
Baby Fox
Bad Seed Rising
Believer
Berri Txarrak (Spain)
Biffy Clyro (US and Japan)
Big Rude Jake
Biohazard
Black Flag
Black Label Society
Black Stone Cherry
Behind Crimson Eyes
Betzefer (excluding US)
Baptized in Blood
Billy Talent (US)
Bleeker Ridge
Boiler Room
Brigade (Japan)
Brujeria
Buzzoven
Caliban
Carnivore
Cavalera Conspiracy
Channel Zero
Chimaira
CKY
Coal Chamber
Code Orange
Collective Soul (via Loud & Proud)
Corrosion of Conformity
Cradle of Filth
Crease (band) 
Creeper
Crimson Glory
The Cult
Cynic
Dååth
De La Tierra
De Novo Dahl
Death
Defiance
Deicide
Delain
Delight (Poland)
Depeche Mode (Brazil)
Detente (band)
DevilDriver
The Devil Wears Prada
Disincarnate
Divine Heresy (excluding US)
Dog Eat Dog
DoubleDrive
Doug Stanhope
Dommin
Downthesun
Down
DragonForce
Dream Theater
Dresden Dolls
Drugstore
Dry Kill Logic
Electric Eel Shock (Japan)
Exhorder
Faktion
Fear Factory
Fever 333
Fiction Plane
Fish (Dick Bros./Roadrunner)
Five Pointe O
Front Line Assembly
Funeral for a Friend (excluding US and UK)
Garrett Lewis
Glassjaw
Gorguts
Grand Magus
The Great Kat
Gruntruck
Guardian
Hail the Villain (US)
Hamlet (Spain)
Harlot
Hatebreed (2006)
Heartist
Heathen
Heaven and Hell (outside the US, Canada and Japan)
Hopesfall (excluding North America)
Horse the Band (Australia and Japan)
Ill Niño
Immolation
In This Moment
Inglorious (US and UK)
Jerry Cantrell
Junkie XL
Jupiter Coyote
Karma to Burn
The Karelia
Kenny Wayne Shepherd (via Loud & Proud)
Khoma
Kids In Glass Houses
Killswitch Engage
King 810
King Diamond
Kiss
Korn
Krypteria
Kvelertak
Lamb of God (excluding US and Canada)
Lenny Kravitz (via Loud & Proud)
Life of Agony
Lynyrd Skynyrd (via Loud & Proud)
Machine Head
Mad Max
Madball
Madina Lake
Make Them Suffer
Malevolent Creation
Marmozets
Mastodon (excluding US)
Megadeth
Mercyful Fate
Milk Teeth
The Misfits
Murderdolls
Mutiny Within
Non-Intentional Lifeform
Nailbomb
New York Dolls
Nickelback (excluding Canada)
Negative (Europe)
Nights Like These
Nightwish (US and Australia)
Obituary
Opeth
Optimum Wound Profile
Outlaws
Pain (Nordic Territories and Europe)
Paradox
The Parlor Mob
Patmos
Pestilence
Pe'z
Periphery
Porcupine Tree
Possessed (Europe)
Powersurge
Queensrÿche (Loud & Proud)
Ratt (Loud & Proud)
Ratos de Porao
The Red Shore (Australia)
Rob Zombie
Royal Republic
Royseven
Rush (outside Canada)
Sacrifice (Europe)
Salem
Sammy Hagar (via Loud & Proud)
Sanctity
Satan
Satyricon
Scar the Martyr
Sepultura
Seven Shades
Skin Chamber
The Sheila Divine
Sinch
Shelter
Shihad
Shinedown
Slash
Slipknot
Soulfly
Soziedad Alkoholika (Spain)
Sparks
Spineshank
Spoil Engine
Staind
Steve Miller Band (via Loud & Proud)
Still Remains
The Stranglers (Germany)
Storm Corrosion
Suffocation
Taking Dawn
Thor
Thornley
Throwdown (excluding US)
Times of Grace
Toxik
Treponem Pal
Type O Negative
VIMIC
Vision of Disorder
Vicious Rumors
Wednesday 13
We Are Harlot
Whiplash (band)
Willard
Wild Throne
The Winery Dogs (via Loud & Proud; US)
Within Temptation
The Wombats (US)
Xentrix
Young the Giant

Criticism 

Since the 1990s, Roadrunner Records has been criticised by several of its past alumni over its record contracts, business practices and management and promotion of its releases. Artists who have criticised Roadrunner include Megadeth, Slipknot, Obituary, Opeth, Chimaira, Vision of Disorder and Sepultura.

Glassjaw members Daryl Palumbo and Justin Beck continue to speak unfavourably of Roadrunner, years after the problems the band experienced with them. They openly advise people not to buy their first full-length so as not to give the label money, and have repeatedly told fans at shows to illegally download the record. Palumbo has said: "Roadrunner is a joke. Roadrunner's not even a real label. It has the power to be one of the superpowers in the heavy music industry. While labels like Victory Records, which is such a small hardcore label, is totally surpassing Roadrunner... It's like the scourge of the music industry. Beck has said: "Seriously, don't ever support anything from Roadrunner – they suck!" Palumbo has said that Roadrunner didn't put the band on enough tours: "We never toured half as much as we wanted to, I just wish we got to tour more in support of [Everything You Ever Wanted to Know About Silence]"; and, "They are a miserable fuckin' corporation that does not bend for their bands, does not give their bands anything and they're just terrible businessmen....They had 2 cash cows, Slipknot and Nickelback, and every other project they had rode backseat to those bands, and then the second that the new Slipknot record came out and didn't go quadruple Platinum in the first few hours it was released they fuckin' turned their backs on Slipknot. That label just wants instant gratification where it sells its units and that's a joke. You can't run a major corporation with that as your business strategy".

See also
 List of record labels
 Earache Records
 Metal Blade Records

Soundtracks
 Faust: Love Of The Damned (2000–2001)
 Ginger Snaps (2000–2001)
 Resident Evil (2002)
 Spider-Man (2002)
 Freddy vs. Jason (2003)
 Resident Evil: Apocalypse (2004)

References

External links
 Main site gives you links to other international sites.
 Official USA site
 Official Canadian site
 Official UK site
 Roadrunner Records' official YouTube channel
 Roadrunner Records' USA Twitter
 Roadrunner US A&R team contact list

American record labels
Heavy metal record labels
Record labels established in 1980
Rock record labels
Warner Music labels
Atlantic Records
IFPI members
Labels distributed by Warner Music Group
1980 establishments in the Netherlands
American companies established in 1980
1986 establishments in New York City